The Pernambuco pygmy owl (Glaucidium mooreorum) is a species of owl in the family Strigidae. This species, first described in 2002, is endemic to Pernambuco state in Brazil.

Taxonomy and systematics

The Pernambuco pygmy owl was first described in December 2002 when two study skins were examined. The skins were originally collected in 1980 and thought to be subspecies of the East Brazilian pygmy owl (Glaucidium minutissimum) or Amazonian pygmy owl (G. hardyi). Upon closer examination of the skins, and vocalizations of the species recorded in 1990, it was concluded that it was a new species.

It was suggested that the type specimen of the East Brazilian pygmy owl is actually of this species, which if true would require that Pernambuco pygmy owl have the binomial G. minutissimum and that the East Brazilian pygmy owl be assigned a new binomial, G. sicki. The suggestion was rejected by the major avian taxonomic systems.

Description

The adult's face is a mix of whitish and brownish streaks and the rest of the head is raw umber with small white dots. The upperparts are chestnut and the tail is blackish brown with lines of white spots making broken bars across it. The underparts are white, the sides of the chest brown, and the flanks streaked with brown. The juvenile plumage is unknown.

Distribution and habitat

The Pernambuco pygmy owl is found only in a small area of Pernambuco state in northeastern Brazil.

Behavior

Feeding

One Pernambuco pygmy owl was observed eating a large cicada. Nothing else is known about its diet, which is assumed to include other invertebrates, small mammals, and small reptiles.

Breeding

The Pernambuco pygmy owl was found to be vocally active during the rainy season, April and May, but no other information about its breeding phenology is known.

Vocalization

The Pernambuco pygmy owl's song is "a short phrase of 5–7 notes" with each note rising in pitch.

Status

The IUCN has assessed the Pernambuco pygmy owl as being Critically Endangered and Possibly Extinct. It was originally assessed without the Possibly Extinct qualifier, but a 2018 study citing bird extinction patterns and the almost complete destruction of its habitat recommended uplisting the owl to Critically Endangered - Possibly Extinct status. It was uplisted the following year.

The species has not been seen since 2001 despite extensive targeted searches. If still extant, it is assumed to have a tiny and declining population within an extremely small range. Any remaining population is estimated at fewer than fifty adult birds.

References

Pernambuco pygmy owl
Endemic birds of Brazil
Critically endangered animals
Critically endangered biota of South America
Pernambuco pygmy owl